The Great Northern O-1 was a class of 145 2-8-2 "Mikado"-type steam locomotives built by the Baldwin Locomotive Works between 1911 and 1919 and used by the Great Northern Railway until the late 1950s.

The O-1s, along with other O Class Mikados of the Great Northern, were used system-wide to pull freight trains. As of today, only one O-1 has been preserved, No. 3059, from the second batch of O-1s. It was retired in December 1957 and is on display near the Williston depot in Williston, North Dakota.

Design
This was attached to a tapered boiler that was pressed to  – even though it had been designed for  – feeding steam to two  cylinders, which were connected to  diameter driving wheels by Walschaerts valve gear. The last five locomotives were delivered with Southern valve gear; however, these were later replaced with Walschaerts.

Construction
All 145 locomotives were built by Baldwin Locomotive Works in four batches between August 1911 and February 1919. Baldwin class 12-50--E was assigned.

Two engines were built as oil burners: 3020 and 3021.

Service
All were assigned to haul freight trains system wide. Between 1925 and 1944, thirteen O-1s (Nos. 3023, 3024, 3026, 3028, 3029, 3039, 3043, 3064, 3099, 3108, 3121, 3122 and 3134) were sold to the Spokane, Portland and Seattle Railway.

Two engines were retired after being involved in wrecks: 3113 in 1946, and 3128 in 1949; the latter was so badly damaged it was scrapped on site. 

The remaining locomotives were retired between 1948 and 1958. The Great Northern were in no hurry to scrap them as it was as late as 1963 that the last locomotive to be scrapped was cut up. 

The Spokane, Portland and Seattle Railway scrapped its O-1s between 1945 and 1950.

Preservation
Only one O-1 has survived into preservation, No. 3059 of the second batch. It was built in February 1913 and retired in December 1957. On August 2, 1958, it was donated for display near the Williston Depot in Williston, North Dakota and currently resides there. It is the sole surviving Great Northern "Mikado" type steam locomotive.

References

Great Northern Railway (U.S.)
2-8-2 locomotives
Baldwin locomotives
Freight locomotives
Railway locomotives introduced in 1911
O-1
Standard gauge locomotives of the United States
Steam locomotives of the United States